Ben Wheeler is an unincorporated community in Van Zandt County, Texas, United States. It lies twelve miles southeast of Canton, and has an estimated population of 400.

History
The area around Ben Wheeler was first settled in the 1840s by Kentucky farmer Benjamin F. Wheeler. Originally known as Clough, after prominent local farmer George W. Clough, the community was renamed Ben Wheeler in 1878 after the town's post office was relocated to the present townsite. The community was beset by many hardships in its early years, including an 1893 fire which destroyed most of the town's businesses. By 1896 the population reached 500, but disaster struck again by way of a smallpox epidemic that reduced the number of residents to 238 by 1904. Somewhat insulated from the effects of the Great Depression by the East Texas Oil Boom, Ben Wheeler had 18 businesses and a population of 375 in 1943. As the oil boom subsided and area cotton production fell, however, Ben Wheeler began a decline which led to the closing of all but nine area businesses by 1972, and the consolidation of its schools with those in nearby Van. By 1988, however, buoyed by the growth of nearby Tyler and Canton, the number of operating businesses in Ben Wheeler had risen to twenty-two and in 2000 the community was home to an estimated 400 residents.

2011 tornado
On Wednesday, April 27, 2011, a moderate tornado with sustained winds of 90-100 mph struck the communities of Ben Wheeler and Edom, Texas. Three structures were destroyed and upwards of another one hundred structures damaged.

Education
Ben Wheeler is served by the Van Independent School District.

Restoration and Revival
Brooks and Rese Gremmels started the Ben Wheeler Arts & Historic District Foundation.  It is a non-profit 501 (c) (3) corporation, designed to restore old buildings and shops in downtown Ben Wheeler.

Annual Feral Hog Festival
Every year on the 4th weekend in October the community celebrates their feral hog population with festivities held downtown. Events include a parade and hog queen contest as well as many other activities and food provided by local businesses.

Climate
The climate in this area is characterized by hot, humid summers and generally mild to cool winters.  According to the Köppen Climate Classification system, Ben Wheeler has a humid subtropical climate, abbreviated "Cfa" on climate maps.

References

External links
Ben Wheeler, Tx at Handbook of Texas Online
Ben Wheeler official home page

Unincorporated communities in Van Zandt County, Texas
Unincorporated communities in Texas